In statistics, the Cunningham function or Pearson–Cunningham function ωm,n(x) is a generalisation of a special function introduced by  and studied in the form here by . It can be defined in terms of  the confluent hypergeometric function U, by

The function was studied by Cunningham in the context of a multivariate generalisation of the Edgeworth expansion for approximating a probability density function based on its (joint) moments. In a more general context, the function is related to the solution of the constant-coefficient diffusion equation, in one or more dimensions.  

The function ωm,n(x) is a solution of the differential equation for X:

The special function studied by Pearson is given, in his notation by,

Notes

References

 See exercise 10, chapter XVI, p. 353

Special hypergeometric functions
Statistical approximations